FC Guadalcanal is a Solomon Islands football club based in Honiara, which plays in the Telekom S-League. Until 2015 they played in the Honiara Football League, but as of the 2015 season they will play on the highest level in the Solomon Islands. 
Besides soccer, the club also has a futsal team.

Achievements
HFA premier division champions 2015: 1st

Current squad
Squad for the 2017 Solomon Islands S-League

References

Football clubs in the Solomon Islands
Honiara